Boys Don't Cry is a 1999 independent romantic drama film directed by Kimberly Peirce and co-written by Peirce and Andy Bienan. The film is based on the life of Brandon Teena, a trans man who was beaten, raped, and murdered in 1993 after his male acquaintances found out that he was transgender. Hilary Swank stars as Teena and Chloë Sevigny plays his girlfriend Lana Tisdel. Peter Sarsgaard and Brendan Sexton III portray Teena's two murderers. The film premiered at the Venice International Film Festival on September 2, 1999. Fox Searchlight Pictures gave the film a limited release on October 22, 1999. Boys Don't Cry grossed over $11 million at the box office in North America. The film was critically acclaimed, particularly for Swank's acting, with reviewer Michael Sragow, calling the film a "critical knockout". Rotten Tomatoes, a review aggregator, surveyed 76 reviews and judged 88% of them to be positive.

Boys Don't Cry garnered awards and nominations in a variety of categories with particular praise for Swank's performance as Teena, its screenplay and its direction. At the 72nd Academy Awards, Swank won for Best Actress, while Sevigny was nominated for Best Supporting Actress; Swank won for Best Actress – Drama, while Sevigny was nominated for the Best Supporting Actress – Motion Picture awards at the 57th Golden Globe Awards. Swank was also nominated for Best Actress in a Leading Role at the 53rd British Academy Film Awards. At the 4th Golden Satellite Awards, both Swank and Sevigny won their respective categories, and the film was nominated for two additional awards—Best Director and Best Film.

Peirce was recognized at several awards ceremonies for her direction of the film as well as her work co-authorship of the screenplay with Andy Bienen. She won the Best New Filmmaker award from the Boston Society of Film Critics, the FIPRESCI and Satyajit Ray Awards at the London Film Festival, the National Board of Review award for Best Directorial Debut, Best Director and Screenwriter at the Young Hollywood Awards, the FIPRESCI and Best Screenplay awards at the Stockholm International Film Festival, and the Audience Choice Award at the St. Louis International Film Festival. In addition, Peirce was further nominated for a European Film Award, the Grand Prix Asturias at the Gijón International Film Festival, the Best First Feature and Best First Screenplay awards at the Independent Spirit Awards.

Accolades

See also 
 1999 in film

References

External links 
 

Boys Don't Cry